Mount Simeon or Mount Simon ( Jabal Simʻān ), also called Mount Laylūn (is a highland region in Aleppo Governorate in northern Syria. The mountain is located in the Mount Simeon and Aʻzāz districts of Aleppo Governorate.

It is named for Symeon the Stylite a Christian who lived atop a column in the region for 37 years and for whom a large monastery complex was established.

Landscape
Mount Simeon is part of the Limestone Massif in the western part of the Aleppo plateau. It is located about 20 km northwest of Aleppo. The mountain runs for 50 km from north to south with a width range of 20–40 km and average elevation of 500–600 m. The highest point is Sheikh Barakāt (876 m) in the southern part of the mountain.

The valley of River ʻIfrīn runs between Mount Simeon and Mount Kurd to the west. Aʻzāz valley marks the northern boundary of the mountain, beyond which lies the Aʻzāz plain and Mount Barṣa (Barṣāyā) on the Aintab plateau. The valley of river Quweiq runs along the eastern side of the mountain. South of the mountain lie the Dāna  and Atarib plains. Old routes connecting Qinnasrin to Antioch run through these plains to the ʻIfrīn valley at its westward turn and separate Mount Simeon from Ḥārim Mountains to the south.

References

External links
 William Kelly Prentice, Greek and Latin Inscriptions in Syria. Princeton University Archaeological Expeditions to Syria in 1904–1905 and 1909.

Aleppo
Aleppo Governorate
Simeon